Harold Kirkwood (15 September 1882 – 19 May 1943) was an Australian cricketer. He played in thirteen first-class matches for South Australia between 1901 and 1914.

See also
 List of South Australian representative cricketers

References

External links
 

1882 births
1943 deaths
Australian cricketers
South Australia cricketers